Plunderphonics 69/96 is a two-CD compilation album by John Oswald. The album compiles most of Oswald's infamous Plunderphonics recordings, including the 1989 Plunderphonic self-released giveway album that ran afoul of the Canadian Recording Industry (CRIA), and the Elektrax promotional EP that had been originally commissioned by Elektra Records. Unlike these previous releases, the artists and bands credited here are done so almost entirely as anagrams of their original names. The "69/96" in the title derives from the fact that Oswald created the recordings represented therein between 1969 and 1996. These numbers are also used in the package design to stand in for quote marks around Oswald's "plunderphonics" neologism.

Oswald originally intended to release the album on his own Fony Records imprint, but allegedly was unable to arrange with all the appropriated parties he had quoted in licensing the tracks, and was therefore about to abandon publication when American experimental music group Negativland, who runs their own micro-label Seeland Records, stepped in and released the project independent of Oswald and his licensing deals.

According to a statement he makes in the album's interview booklet, Oswald intended Plunderphonics 69/96 to be packaged as a box set so that record stores would be forced to file the album in the more visible and musically diverse box set area rather than in an experimental music section in the back of the record store. Since Oswald's name does not appear on the outside package, the box set would be filed as if Plunderphonics was the artist/group name, thus having it filed between Luciano Pavarotti and Prince.

The two discs are categorized and identified as "Songs" and "Tunes". The tracks represented on "Songs" are based on rock and pop music, while the "Tunes" disc has cuts based on classical, jazz and other instrumental music.

The second disc is mastered so that it actually begins with track number 27, rather than track 1. This technical variation nonetheless made it impossible for some Plunderphonics fans, especially those using Apple computers, to either play the second disc on their computer or rip MP3 files for use in digital media devices like the iPod, unless "particular software" identified on the Plunderphonics website at the time was used.

Z24 is an excerpt from Strauss' Also sprach Zarathustra, made by overlapping 24 different orchestra recordings.

Track listing

References

John Oswald (composer) albums
2001 compilation albums
Seeland Records compilation albums
2001 remix albums
Plunderphonics albums